"We Are Done" is a song written by Eric Valentine for The Madden Brothers' first studio album Greetings from California. The song premiered on May 30, 2014, on 102.7 KIIS FM. Two music videos were filmed for the song. "We Are Done" was released to mainstream radio on July 1, 2014.

This song was very successful particularly in the Oceania region, where it topped the singles charts in Australia and New Zealand. It is also featured on the FIFA 15 soundtrack and Guitar Hero Live.

Track listing
Digital download
"We Are Done" – 3:36

Charts

Weekly charts

Year-end charts

Certifications

Release history

References

2014 singles
2014 songs
The Madden Brothers songs
Songs written by Benji Madden
Songs written by Joel Madden
Capitol Records singles
Song recordings produced by Eric Valentine
Number-one singles in Australia
Number-one singles in New Zealand